0.01 is the debut studio album of H3llb3nt, released on February 20, 1996 by Fifth Colvmn Records. Sonic Boom called 0.01 an "exquisitely tuned finite element state machine which hums along with a groove all of its own" and only criticized the album for being too short.

Track listing

Personnel 
Adapted from the 0.01 liner notes.

H3llb3nt
 Bryan Barton
 Charles Levi
 Jared Louche
 Jordan Nogood – design
 Eric Powell
Ben BABOOSHAN
j-den fam

Additional musicians
 Jon Irish
 Dylan Thomas More
 Ned Wahl
 Rob Williams

Production
 John Golden – production, engineering, mixing
 H3llb3nt – engineering, mixing
 Greg Reierson – mastering

Release history

References

External links 
 0.01 at Discogs (list of releases)

1996 debut albums
H3llb3nt albums
Fifth Colvmn Records albums